Marshall Strickland (born March 1, 1983) is an American former professional basketball player. He played college basketball at Indiana University for four years from 2002 to 2006. He is originally from Kingston, Massachusetts and went to Winchendon Prep in Winchendon before transferring to South Carroll High School in Carroll County, Maryland. He is the son of Marshall and Joanna Strickland, and younger brother of former Maryland Terrapins star Marche Strickland. Marshall is a graduate of the University of Maryland School of Dentistry in 2017.

College career
As a senior, coach Mike Davis started him in every game for which he was healthy. He averaged 11.9 points per game, third on the team behind Robert Vaden and Marco Killingsworth. He was first in minutes per game with 34.5 and first in FT percentage shooting 94%.
As a junior, he started in 28 out of 29 games leading the team in assists with 3.4 per game.
As a sophomore, he was an honorable All-Big Ten selection by the coaches. He was second on the team with 10.8 points and 26th overall in the Big Ten.  He was also 11th in the league in three-point field goal percentage (.367, 58 of 158).
As a freshman, he played consistent minutes with a season high 17 points in the championship game of the Maui Invitational. As a senior in high school he was an All-Metro honoree while averaging 30.5 points, 4.3 assists and 1.9 steals.  He shot 52% from the floor and his team finished with a 20-5 record.
As a recruit, ESPN and RivalsHoops.com ranked him among the top five point guards.

External links
iuhoosiers.com profile
TBLStat.net profile

1983 births
Living people
Alpella basketball players
American expatriate basketball people in Italy
American expatriate basketball people in Poland
American expatriate basketball people in Turkey
AZS Koszalin players
Galatasaray S.K. (men's basketball) players
Indiana Hoosiers men's basketball players
People from Kingston, Massachusetts
People from Sykesville, Maryland
Point guards
TED Ankara Kolejliler players
American men's basketball players
The Winchendon School alumni
Sportspeople from Plymouth County, Massachusetts
Sportspeople from the Baltimore metropolitan area